This is a list of  Armenian journalists, those born in Armenia and who have established citizenship or residency.

Notable journalists

Levon Ananyan
Hambardzum Arakelian
Mkrtich Avetisian
Edik Baghdasaryan
Zori Balayan
Zaven Biberyan
Nelli Sargsyan
Anoosh Chakelian
Grigor Atanesian

Assassinated Armenian journalists

Hrant Dink

Armenian film critics
Don Askarian
Artsvi Bakhchinyan

References

Notes

Armenian journalists
Armenian film critics
Lists of people by nationality and occupation